The 2019–20 season is the 11th season in Viitorul Constanța's history, and the 8th in the top-flight of Romanian football. Viitorul competes in Liga I and in the Cupa României.

Previous season positions

Season overview

June
On 1 June, FC Viitorul Constanța appointed Gheorghe Popescu as the new Executive President of the team. He was presented in a press conference alongside the owner of the club, Gheorghe Hagi.

July
11 players trained at the Gheorghe Hagi Academy and FC Viitorul Constanța were called up to the Romania national under-21 football team, who were semi-finalists at the 2019 UEFA European Under-21 Championship in Italy and San Marino, held this summer.

On 12 July Ianis Hagi, the captain of FC Viitorul Constanța at the time, signed for Belgian club K.R.C. Genk for a reported fee of €8 million.

October
On 19 October, Gheorghe Hagi Football Academy announced the separation from Lucian Burchel.

On 27 October Louis Munteanu was the 39th player from the Gheorghe Hagi Football Academy to be promoted to Liga 1.

November
On 29 November the Gheorghe Hagi Football Academy and FC Viitorul Constanța signed a partnership with CS Năvodari, a fellow professional Romanian club playing in Liga IV.

December
On 6 December, Gheorghe Hagi Football Academy signed a partnership with AVA Football Academy London, the first ever international partnership for the Gheorghe Hagi Football Academy.

January
On 5 January, FC Viitorul Constanța announced the separation from George Ogăraru.

On 15 January the Gheorghe Hagi Football Academy signed a partnership with  LPS Bihorul Oradea.

February
On 5 February Bogdan Țîru, the captain of FC Viitorul Constanța at the time, signed for Polish club Jagiellonia Białystok for a reported fee of €600,000.

June
On 16 June Darius Grosu was the 40th player from the Gheorghe Hagi Football Academy to be promoted to Liga 1.

July
On 25 July Alexandru Georgescu was the 41st player from the Gheorghe Hagi Football Academy to be promoted to Liga 1.

On 27 July the Gheorghe Hagi Football Academy signed a partnership with iSport Vâlcea.

On 29 July Ștefan Bodișteanu was the 42nd player from the Gheorghe Hagi Football Academy to be promoted to Liga 1.

August
On 1 August Bogdan Lazăr was the 43th player from the Gheorghe Hagi Football Academy to be promoted to Liga 1.

On 2 August, FC Viitorul Constanța announced the separation from Gheorghe Hagi, the manager of FC Viitorul Constanța at the time.

On 5 August Luca Andronache was the 44th player from the Gheorghe Hagi Football Academy to be promoted to Liga 1.

Gabriel Iancu ended the 2019–20 season as the top scorer of the league championship.

Club officials

Management

 Last updated: 1 June 2019
 Source: Board of directors (Hagi Academy)
 Source: Board of directors (Viitorul)

Current technical staff

 Last updated: 7 August 2019
 Source: Technical staff
 Source: Medical staff

Players

Current squad

Transfers

In

Loans in

Out

Loans out

Retired players

Friendly matches

Competitions

Supercupa României

Final

Liga I

The Liga I fixture list was announced in July 2019.

Regular season

Table

Results by round

Matches

Relegation round

Table

Results by round

Matches

Cupa României

Viitorul will enter the Cupa României at the Round of 32.

Round of 32

UEFA Europa League

Qualifying rounds

Second qualifying round

Statistics

Appearances and goals

                      

 

! colspan="13" style="background:#DCDCDC; text-align:center" | Players sent out on loan this season
|-

! colspan="13" style="background:#DCDCDC; text-align:center" | Players transferred out during the season
|-

|}

Goalscorers

Clean sheets

1 Valentin Cojocaru was transferred to FC Voluntari during the winter transfer window.

Attendances

Disciplinary record

Includes all competitive matches. Players listed below made at least one appearance for FC Viitorul Constanța first squad during the season.

|-
| 21
| MF
| 
|Paul Iacob
| 3
| 0
| 0
| 0
| 0
| 0
| 1
| 0
| 0
| 1
| 0
| 0
! 5
! 0
! 0
! 0
|-
| 9
| FW
| 
|Gabriel Iancu
| 8
| 0
| 0
| 0
| 0
| 0
| 1
| 0
| 0
| 1
| 0
| 0
! 10
! 0
! 0
! 0
|-
| 18
| MF
| 
|Andrei Artean
| 8
| 0
| 0
| 0
| 0
| 0
| 0
| 0
| 0
| 0
| 0
| 0
! 8
! 0
! 0
! 0
|-
| 20
| MF
| 
|Andrei Tîrcoveanu
| 1
| 0
| 0
| 0
| 0
| 0
| 0
| 0
| 0
| 0
| 0
| 0
! 1
! 0
! 0
! 0
|-
| 4
| DF
| 
|Bas Kuipers
| 1
| 0
| 0
| 0
| 0
| 0
| 0
| 0
| 0
| 0
| 0
| 0
! 1
! 0
! 0
! 0
|-
| 15
| DF
| 
|Bogdan Țîru
| 8
| 0
| 0
| 0
| 0
| 0
| 0
| 0
| 0
| 0
| 0
| 0
! 8
! 0
! 0
! 0
|-
| 11
| DF
| 
|George Ganea
| 4
| 0
| 0
| 0
| 0
| 0
| 0
| 0
| 0
| 1
| 0
| 0
! 5
! 0
! 0
! 0
|-
| 6
| DF
| 
|Bradley de Nooijer
| 0
| 1
| 0
| 0
| 0
| 0
| 0
| 0
| 0
| 1
| 0
| 0
! 2
! 0
! 0
! 0
|-
| 2
| DF
| 
|Radu Boboc
| 6
| 0
| 0
| 0
| 0
| 0
| 0
| 0
| 0
| 0
| 0
| 0
! 6
! 0
! 0
! 0
|-
| 3
| DF
| 
|Steliano Filip
| 3
| 0
| 0
| 0
| 0
| 0
| 0
| 0
| 0
| 0
| 0
| 0
! 3
! 0
! 0
! 0
|-
| 77
| MF
| 
|Vlad Achim
| 7
| 0
| 0
| 0
| 0
| 0
| 0
| 0
| 0
| 0
| 0
| 0
! 7
! 0
! 0
! 0
|-
| 19
| MF
| 
|Lyes Houri
| 4
| 0
| 0
| 0
| 0
| 0
| 0
| 0
| 0
| 0
| 0
| 0
! 4
! 0
! 0
! 0
|-
| 5
| DF
| 
|Sebastian Mladen
| 8
| 0
| 0
| 0
| 0
| 0
| 0
| 0
| 0
| 0
| 0
| 0
! 8
! 0
! 0
! 0
|-
| 27
| MF
| 
|Marco Dulca
| 2
| 0
| 0
| 0
| 0
| 0
| 0
| 0
| 0
| 0
| 0
| 0
! 2
! 0
! 0
! 0
|-
| 13
| MF
| 
|Cosmin Matei
| 4
| 0
| 0
| 0
| 0
| 0
| 0
| 0
| 0
| 0
| 0
| 0
! 4
! 0
! 0
! 0
|-
| 43
| GK
| 
|Cătălin Căbuz
| 3
| 0
| 0
| 0
| 0
| 0
| 0
| 0
| 0
| 0
| 0
| 0
! 3
! 0
! 0
! 0
|-
| 17
| MF
| 
|Andrei Ciobanu
| 4
| 0
| 0
| 0
| 0
| 0
| 0
| 0
| 0
| 0
| 0
| 0
! 4
! 0
! 0
! 0
|-
| 5
| DF
| 
|Virgil Ghiță
| 3
| 0
| 0
| 0
| 0
| 0
| 0
| 0
| 0
| 0
| 0
| 0
! 3
! 0
! 0
! 0
|-
|-
| 22
| DF
| 
|Cristian Ganea
| 1
| 0
| 0
| 0
| 0
| 0
| 0
| 0
| 0
| 0
| 0
| 0
! 1
! 0
! 0
! 0
|-
|-
| 4
| DF
| 
|Damien Dussaut
| 4
| 0
| 0
| 0
| 0
| 0
| 0
| 0
| 0
| 0
| 0
| 0
! 4
! 0
! 0
! 0
|-
|-
| 20
| MF
| 
|Malcom Edjouma
| 1
| 0
| 0
| 0
| 0
| 0
| 0
| 0
| 0
| 0
| 0
| 0
! 1
! 0
! 0
! 0
|-
|-
| 97
| DF
| 
|Darius Grosu
| 1
| 0
| 0
| 0
| 0
| 0
| 0
| 0
| 0
| 0
| 0
| 0
! 1
! 0
! 0
! 0
|-
|-
| 20
| DF
| 
|Bogdan Lazăr
| 1
| 0
| 0
| 0
| 0
| 0
| 0
| 0
| 0
| 0
| 0
| 0
! 1
! 0
! 0
! 0
|-

Managerial statistics (2019-20 season)

UEFA Club rankings
This is the current UEFA Club Rankings, including season 2019–20.

See also
 2019–20 Cupa României
 2019–20 Liga I

References

FC Viitorul Constanța seasons
Viitorul, Constanța, FC